José Manuel "Manu" Hernando Riol (born 19 July 1998) is a Spanish footballer who plays as a central defender for Portuguese club C.D. Tondela.

Club career
Born in Palencia, Castile and León, Hernando joined Real Madrid's La Fábrica in 2010, from Club Internacional de la Amistad. Initially an attacking midfielder, he was converted into a central defender during his formation, and signed a five-year contract in March 2014.

Promoted to the reserves for the 2017–18 season, Hernando made his senior debut on 8 October 2017, starting in a 0–2 Segunda División B away loss against Pontevedra CF. He scored his first goal for Castilla on 18 November, netting the opener in a 1–1 home draw against CD Toledo.

A regular starter under Santiago Solari, Hernando spent the first months of the 2018–19 campaign out due to a knee injury, but still renewed his contract until 2022 on 15 November 2018. The following 2 January, he joined Segunda División's Racing de Santander on loan until June.

Hernando made his professional debut on 24 January 2020, coming on as a substitute for Nico Hidalgo in a 0–1 away loss against Cádiz CF. He scored his first professional goal on 7 March, netting his team's second in a 2–1 win at CD Numancia.

On 14 August 2020, Hernando was loaned to fellow second division side SD Ponferradina for the season. On 16 July of the following year, he moved abroad and signed a two-year contract with C.D. Tondela of the Portuguese Primeira Liga.

Career statistics

Club

References

External links
Real Madrid Profile

1998 births
Living people
People from Palencia
Sportspeople from the Province of Palencia
Spanish footballers
Footballers from Castile and León
Association football defenders
Segunda División players
Segunda División B players
Real Madrid Castilla footballers
Racing de Santander players
SD Ponferradina players
C.D. Tondela players
Spain youth international footballers
Spain under-21 international footballers
Spanish expatriate footballers
Spanish expatriate sportspeople in Portugal
Expatriate footballers in Portugal